Ellis Ferreira and Rick Leach were the defending champions but they competed with different partners that year, Ferreira with Pavel Vízner and Leach with Brian MacPhie.

Ferreira and Vízner lost in the quarterfinals to Leach and MacPhie.

Leach and MacPhie lost in the semifinals to Nicolas Escudé and Fabrice Santoro.

Escudé and Santoro won in the final 6–3, 7–6(8–6) against Gustavo Kuerten and Cédric Pioline.

Seeds
Champion seeds are indicated in bold text while text in italics indicates the round in which those seeds were eliminated. All eight seeded teams received byes to the second round.

Draw

Final

Top half

Bottom half

External links
 2002 BNP Paribas Masters Doubles Draw

2002 BNP Paribas Masters
Doubles